Blair Witch 2: Book of Shadows is a film score by Carter Burwell, released through Milan/Flash Cut Records on October 24, 2000. The soundtrack was re-released in 2001 and bundled with the DVD+CD by Artisan Entertainment.

Track listing

Release
The score was released on compact disc on October 24, 2000.

Critical response
Heather Phares of AllMusic wrote of the album: "Though this score isn't Burwell's best work, it still manages to create as much of an ominous, suspenseful air about the film as possible."

References 

Film scores
2000 soundtrack albums
Instrumental soundtracks
Horror film soundtracks
Carter Burwell albums